Princess Ashraf us-Sultana was a princess of Persia. She was the daughter of Mohammad Taqi Mirza Rokn ed-Dowleh, son of Mohammad Shah Qajar.

Princess Ashraf married Nuzrat ol-Molk (1840 – 1903).

References

Qajar princesses
1808 births
1848 deaths